The Murgese horse originated in the Murge, Apulia area of Italy during the Spanish rule, and was developed from Barb and Arabian horses.  They are a hardy breed that is used mainly for cross-country riding, although they have also been used for light draft work.

History

The Murgese breed originated in Italy during the period of Spanish rule. It is thought that they were developed by crossing Barb and Arabian horses imported by the Count of Conversano  with native horses,  especially the Neapolitan. The breed was extremely popular, especially with the Italian cavalry, during the 15th and 16th centuries, but then declined in numbers until it was almost extinct.

In the treatise "Il Cavallarizzo" written by Claudio Corte in 1562, three years after the end of the Great Italian Wars, the author describes how the best Neapolitan war horses came from the Puglie region and from Calabria, indicating that "Neapolitan horses" were all the horses bred for war in the Kingdom of Naples, which included Puglie and Calabria.  Hence, the Murgese is considered as the direct descendant of the famous Neapolitan horse.

The present day Murgese breed was developed from horses selected in 1926, when the herdbook was established, and is possibly a more refined version of the original Murgese horse.  Until selection began in 1926 there were very diverse physical characteristics within the breed due to lack of breeding regulations.  The original horses selected to revitalize the Murgese breed were a group of 46 mares and 9 stallions.  The original center for selective breeding was the Institute for the Improvement of Horse Populations (then known as the Stallion Stud), where three foundation stallions, Nerone, Granduca, and Araldo delle Murge, formed the main bloodlines of the breed today.

In 1990 the Italian Ministry of Agriculture and Forestry established the Anagraphic Register to record equine groups identifiable as individual breeds, which included the Murgese. As of 2005, the Murgese population numbers more than 1500 breeding animals, including 1080 mares, 107 stallions and 350 foals. Before registration, all animals are blood typed, and in 2004, an extensive study was performed to analyze the amount of inbreeding present in the Murgese breed and concluded that the amount of inbreeding was within acceptable levels.

Breed characteristics

The head is light, with a straight or slightly convex profile, a broad forehead, and sometimes a prominent jaw. The neck is sturdy and broad at the base, the withers pronounced, the chest well-developed, and the shoulders sloping. The  croup is long and broad and can be either flat or sloping. The legs are strong with large joints. The hooves are black and extremely hard, a feature for which the breed is famous. Stallions are rarely gelded, since they are very docile and can be ridden without problems. They are quite similar to the Friesian horse or to modern breeds such as the Warlander, Georgian Grande Horse, or the Spanish-Norman horse .

Uses

Murgese horses are generally used for trekking and cross-country riding, although they have also traditionally been used for farm work and light draft work.  They are still popular on small farms where they are sought for their multi-purpose usefulness. The ancestors of the Murgese influenced the Lipizzaner, through the stallions Neapolitano and Conversano (two founding stallions of the Lipizzaner breed), and many were exported to Spain and to Northern Europe where they influenced the development of breeds such as Frederiksborg horse and Kladruber.

References

External links 
Cavallo delle Murge
Genetic study of Murgese horse from genealogical data and microsatellites - Inbreeding Study

Horse breeds
Horse breeds originating in Italy